SN 2003B was a type II supernova that happened in NGC 1097 on January 5, 2003.

See also
 SN 2006X
 Spiral Galaxy NGC 1097

External links
 Light curves and spectra on the Open Supernova Catalog
 Supernova 2003B 
 IAUC

Fornax (constellation)
20030105
Supernova remnants
Supernovae